José "Pepe" Díaz (1776 - April 30, 1797) and Francisco Díaz (1777 - ?) were two cousins who served as Sergeants in the Toa Alta Militia. Both cousins helped defeat Sir Ralph Abercromby and defend Puerto Rico during an invasion in 1797.

Early years
The Díaz cousins were born and raised in the town of Toa Alta, Puerto Rico when the island was a Spanish colony. They were both Sergeants in the Toa Alta Militia, and with their unit were sent to defend San Juan upon the attempted invasion of the island by British forces under the command of Sir Ralph Abercromby.

Defense of Puerto Rico
On February 17, 1797, the appointed governor of Puerto Rico, Brigadier Ramón de Castro, received the news that the British had captured the island of Trinidad. Believing that Puerto Rico would be the next British objective, he decided to put the local militia on alert and to prepare the island's forts against any military action.

Battle of San Juan

On April 17, 1797, British ships under the command of Sir Ralph Abercromby were unable to penetrate the defenses of "El Morro" and opted to make their attack from the coastal town of Loíza, to the east of San Juan. On April 18, British soldiers and German mercenaries ("Hessians") landed on Loíza's beach.

On April 20, the British tried to establish a battery on the Cerro del Condado overlooking the Spanish positions to the East. José Díaz set out with 50 men to contain an attack which was being attempted at the rear.

On April 24, Sergeant Francisco Díaz was chosen to lead a raid against the enemy. He had 70 volunteers, 20 from the Disciplined Militias and 50 from men being sent to prison. At daybreak they set out in pirogues (a small, flat-bottomed boat), supported by two gunboats, passing down the San Antonio Channel and landed close to the enemy trenches and batteries. The Spanish artillery batteries had previously laid down a heavy covering barrage, and as soon as they saw that Francisco Díaz and his troops had landed, they were ordered to maintain and fire only gunpowder from the cannons without firing the cannonballs. The batteries were also prepared to provide cover in case a retreat was necessary.

Unable to penetrate the firepower of El Morro and the other fortresses, the British twice tried to take the Martín Peña Bridge, a key passage to the San Juan islet. On April 30, when the British made their second attempt, Sergeant Major José Díaz was among the 800 men assembled by Capt. Luis de Lara to protect the Martín Peña Bridge. The men reached the bridge, but were soon attacked by the British. Capt. de Lara responded with his own battery and he directed his cavalry to the flanks and opened up with musket fire. Among those who died in the battle was Sergeant Major José Díaz who was struck by a shell at the bridge.

Aftermath
The invasion failed because of an unexpectedly spirited defense of the island by the garrison. The continuous flow of reinforcements from various towns of Puerto Rico into San Juan, the inability to break through the line of the forts San Antonio and San Gerónimo, and the counterattacking pressure and surprisingly sophisticated battle tactics of the militia and cavalry at the Martín Peña bridge were proved too much for the British. The British retreated on April 30 to their ships and on May 2 set sail northward. Governor Ramon de Castro petitioned Spanish King Charles IV for recognition for the victors; he was promoted to field marshal, Sergeant Major José "Pepe" Díaz was posthumously named "The King of Spain's Bravest Soldier", Sergeant Francisco Díaz was promoted to Lieutenant and was given a pay raise.

Lt. Francisco Díaz was married to Isabel de Castro, who was awarded a monthly pension by the government upon his death. His granddaughter, Isabel Matilde Díaz y Ruiz, married Román Baldorioty de Castro.

Legacy

The people of Toa Alta have honored the Díaz cousins in the design of the town's coat of arms. The right small shield with the star and eight rays, represent Francisco Díaz and his cousin José, who gave his life in the defense of the Martín Peña bridge. In the Spanish heraldic the star is symbol of the last name Díaz... which means "Son of Diego".

Sergeant Major José Díaz has also become part of the islands folklore. Puerto Rican "Jíbaro's" (peasants) sang the following "copla" (ballad) about him:

The statue of Juan Ponce de León situated in the Plaza de San José in Old San Juan was made from the cannons left behind by Sir Ralph Abercromby and his men.

See also

List of Puerto Ricans
List of Puerto Rican military personnel
Military history of Puerto Rico
Colonel Rafael Conti

References

Notes

Diaz, Jose
Diaz, Francisco
Diaz, Jose
People from Toa Alta, Puerto Rico
People of the Spanish colonial Americas
Puerto Rican Army personnel
Colonial Puerto Rico
Puerto Rican folklore
18th-century Puerto Rican people